Jumma may refer to:
 Friday prayer of Muslims
 Jumma people, the tribes of Chittagong Hill Tracts in Bangladesh

Persons named Jumma:
 Jumma Khan Marri, nationalist leader from Baluchistan
 Jumma Jan, name used by United States for a citizen of Tajikistan, held in extrajudicial detention in the United States Guantanamo Bay detainment camps, in Cuba